

The Men's time trial road cycling events at the 2004 Summer Paralympics were held at Vouliagmeni on 24 September.

There were three classes. Athletes with an impairment affecting their legs competed using a handcycle. Athletes with an impairment that affected their balance used a tricycle.

HC A

The handcycle HC Div A event was won by Christoph Etzlstorfer, representing .

Results
27 Sept. 2004, 09:00

HC B/C

The handcycle HC Div B/C event was won by Marcel Pipek, representing . As the event covered more than one disability class, the standings were ranked in order of a calculated time.

Results
27 Sept. 2004, 09:07

CP 1/2

The tricycle CP Div 1/2 event was won by Dirk Boon, representing . As the event covered more than one disability class, the standings were ranked in order of a calculated time.

Results
27 Sept. 2004, 09:21

References

M
2004 in road cycling
Vouliagmeni Olympic Centre events